LeGrant Edward Scott (July 25, 1910 – November 12, 1993) was a professional baseball player.  He was an outfielder for one season (1939) with the Philadelphia Phillies.  For his career, he compiled a .280 batting average in 232 at-bats, with one home run and 26 runs batted in.

An alumnus of the University of Alabama, he was born in Cleveland, Ohio and died in Birmingham, Alabama at the age of 83.

External links

1910 births
1993 deaths
Alabama Crimson Tide baseball players
Americus Phillies players
Atlanta Crackers players
Baseball players from Cleveland
Birmingham Barons players
Detroit Tigers scouts
Indianapolis Indians players
Major League Baseball outfielders
Minor league baseball managers
Nashville Vols players
Oakland Athletics scouts
Rochester Red Wings players
Philadelphia Phillies players
Philadelphia Phillies scouts
San Diego Padres scouts
San Francisco Giants scouts
Toronto Maple Leafs (International League) players